1st Division is the name of the second highest handball league for both genders. The top-ranking teams each wins promotion to Damehåndboldligaen and Danish Handball League, while the bottom finishers get relegated to the Danish 2nd Divisions. The division consists of 14 teams that meet each opponent once away and once at home.

Promotion to the League

Women

In Promotion to the Danish Women's Handball League is the winner of the 1st division ensures direct promotion to the league while no. 2 from the 1st division is playing against no. 11 from Women's Handball League and no. 10 from the 1st division is playing against no. 10 from Women's Handball League. Playing 1 home and 1 away about promotion

Men

In promotion to the Danish Handball League is the winner of the 1st division ensures direct promotion to the league while number 2-4 is playing a playoff against number 9-13 from Danish Handball League. The 8 teams will be divided into two groups and play two matches against each other, one at home and one away. Number 1-2 is promoted while numb7er 3 from each group is playing against each other. The winner is promoted with the 4 other teams

Relegation

Basically moves no. 12, 13 and 14 into the second division, while no. 10 and 11 to play qualification matches in order to survive. However, this is only applicable if non 2nd team to a team in the league or first division win its second division pool (there are three pools in the 2nd division). For every other team that wins its pool in the second division reduced the number of direct relegated with one team and playoff seats (Nos. 10 and 11) moved corresponding downward.

Playoff teams meetings at his team from the second division in an effort to survive in the series. The first match played in the second division side's home ground, the return game they play at home. The team with the greatest goal difference after the two matches played the following season in the first division

Current Season (2021/2022)

See also
 Handball
 Danish Women's Handball League
 Danish Handball League

Women's handball in Denmark
Women's handball leagues
Professional sports leagues in Denmark
Women's sports leagues in Denmark